Martin Tauamanu Tevaseu (born October 7, 1987) is a former American football nose tackle. He signed with the Cleveland Browns in 2010 as an undrafted free agent. He played college football at University of Nevada, Las Vegas. Martin now works as a defensive line coach for Santa Rosa Junior College

Early years
Born in Oakland, Tevaseu was raised in Boonville, California, where he attended Anderson Valley High School. His parents are of Samoan descent. He signed a letter of intent to play college football for the Arizona State Sun Devils, but suffered a severe knee injury during practice. He played at Santa Rosa Junior College before transferring to University of Nevada, Las Vegas.

Professional career

Cleveland Browns
Tevaseu was not selected in the 2010 NFL Draft. Even after running a 4.96 40 at his pro day. After attending a three-day tryout with the Cleveland Browns in early May, the team signed Tevaseu to a contract. The Browns waived Tevaseu a month later.

New York Jets
Tevaseu signed with the New York Jets on July 20, 2010. Tevaseu broke his hand early in training camp. In spite of this, Tevaseu practiced every day with a club on the broken hand. Head coach Rex Ryan praised his tenacity.

Tevaseu was released from the active roster during the Jets' final round of cuts prior to the start of the season. He was promptly re-signed to the team's practice squad.

Tevaseu was promoted to the active roster on January 22, 2011. He was waived on September 4, 2011. He was signed to the practice squad on September 5. He was promoted to the active roster on October 12. He was waived on October 18. He was re-signed to the team's practice squad two days later. He was promoted back to the active roster on October 22. On August 31, 2012, he was waived.

Indianapolis Colts
Tevaseu was claimed off waivers by the Indianapolis Colts on September 1, 2012.
He was released on August 31, 2013 as the Indianapolis Colts got down to the league-mandated 53-player roster to start the season.

Personal life
Tevaseu was born to Debby Fanene. Tevaseu has several other siblings, two brothers and five sisters. Tevaseu is the cousin of former UNLV Rebel and fullback Frank Summers.

References

External links
UNLV biography
New York Jets bio

1987 births
Living people
People from Boonville, California
American sportspeople of Samoan descent
American football defensive tackles
UNLV Rebels football players
Players of American football from Oakland, California
Cleveland Browns players
New York Jets players
Indianapolis Colts players